Shadows Over Baker Street is an anthology of stories, each by a different author and each concerning an exploit of Arthur Conan Doyle's Sherlock Holmes set against the backdrop of H. P. Lovecraft's Cthulhu Mythos. The collection is edited by Michael Reaves and John Pelan, who also contributed the introduction. Doyle's estate approved the book.

Table of contents

See also

All-Consuming Fire
Sherlock Holmes: The Awakened
Gaslight Grimoire

External links
   Sherlock Holmes Vs. Cthulhu!

Crossover fiction
Cthulhu Mythos anthologies
Sherlock Holmes short story collections
Sherlock Holmes pastiches
2003 anthologies
Del Rey books
Mystery anthologies